The 1944–45 Toronto Maple Leafs season was the club's 28th season in the NHL.  Toronto finished in third place in the regular season, with a 24–22–4 record, earning 52 points.  The Leafs eliminated their archrivals Montreal Canadiens in the first round of the playoffs, and then defeated the Detroit Red Wings in seven games in the 1945 Stanley Cup Finals.

Regular season
Toronto was a very streaky club during the regular season, where they started off very hot, winning their first six games, and 10 of their first 14, before a mid-season slump, when they managed a 5–10–2 record in 17 games.  The Leafs would continue to be a streaky club for the remainder of the year, which included a five-game winning streak, and a seven-game winless streak.  Overall, the Maple Leafs managed to end the season with a 24–22–4 record, earning 52 points, and third place in the NHL standings.

The Leafs offense was led teenage superstar Ted Kennedy, who turned 19 during the season, and had a club high 29 goals and 54 points.  Gus Bodnar, who was also 19 years old, led the club with 36 assists, while Lorne Carr put together another solid season, scoring 21 goals and adding 25 assists for 46 points.  Sweeney Schriner, who only appeared in 26 games, managed to score 22 goals and 37 points.  Babe Pratt led the Leafs defense, scoring 18 goals and 41 points, while fellow blueliner Reg Hamilton had 15 points, and a team high 41 penalty minutes.

In goal, rookie Frank McCool had all the action, winning 24 games and posting a 3.22 GAA, while earning four shutouts.  McCool would win the Calder Memorial Trophy for his efforts.

The Maple Leafs would open the playoffs against the heavily favoured and defending Stanley Cup champions, the Montreal Canadiens in a best of 7 series.  The Canadiens dominated the league, as they had a record of 38–8–4, recording 80 points, which was 28 more than the Leafs.  Toronto stunned the Canadiens in the series opener at the Montreal Forum, as Frank McCool shut out the Habs in a 1–0 Leafs victory.  The Leafs then went up 2–0 in the series, winning a close game by a 3–2 score.  The series shifted to Maple Leaf Gardens, however, the Canadiens roared back, easily defeating Toronto 4–1 to cut the Leafs series lead to 2–1.  The fourth game was decided in overtime, and it was the Leafs who were victorious, winning 4–3, and taking a commanding 3–1 series lead.  The series moved back to Montreal for the fifth game, and the Canadiens easily dismantled the Leafs, winning 10–3, and sending the series back to Toronto for the sixth game.  The Maple Leafs would complete the upset, hanging on for a 4–3 win in the game, and win the series 4–2.

Toronto's opponent in the 1945 Stanley Cup Finals was the Detroit Red Wings, who finished the regular season with a 31–14–5 record, earning 67 points, which was 15 higher than the Leafs.  The Red Wings had defeated the Boston Bruins in seven games in the first round.  Toronto, led by Frank McCool, would shutout the Red Wings in the first two games held at the Detroit Olympia for an early series lead.  The Maple Leafs returned home for the third game, and took a 3–0 series lead as McCool would earn another shutout as Toronto won the game 1–0.  The Red Wings managed to finally find the back of the net in the fourth game, winning 5–3 to avoid the sweep.  Detroit goaltender Harry Lumley then shutout the Leafs in the fifth game by a score of 2–0, and he would once again earn a shutout in the sixth game, as Detroit won the game 1–0 in overtime to set up a seventh and deciding game.  Toronto, led by goaltender Frank McCool and Babe Pratt, who scored the series winning goal, managed to hang on for a 2–1 victory in the seventh game to win the Stanley Cup for the fifth time in club history, and their first title in three years.

Final standings

Record vs. opponents

Schedule and results

Playoffs

Toronto Maple Leafs 4, Montreal Canadiens 2

Toronto Maple Leafs 4, Detroit Red Wings 3

Player statistics

Regular season
Scoring

Goaltending

Playoffs
Scoring

Goaltending

Awards and records

Transactions
October 13, 1944: Acquired Bill Ezinicki from the Buffalo Bisons of the AHL for George Boothman and Don Webster
October 25, 1944: Signed Free Agent Frank McCool
November 24, 1944: Acquired John Mahaffy from the Montreal Canadiens for cash
December 24, 1944: Acquired Art Jackson from the Boston Bruins for $7,500 and Future Considerations

See also
1944–45 NHL season

References

SHRP Sports
The Internet Hockey Database
Goalies Archive
National Hockey League Guide & Record Book 2007

Stanley Cup championship seasons
Toronto Maple Leafs seasons
Toronto
Toronto